The Jinluen River is a river in Taitung County, Taiwan. It passes through Taimali and JInfeng Townships.

Tributaries 
The Jinluen River has two major tributaries: the Balao and Dulaolaoen Rivers.

See also 

List of rivers in Taiwan

References 

Rivers of Taiwan